Korado Korlević (born on 19 September 1958 in Poreč) is a Croatian teacher and prolific amateur astronomer, who ranks among the world's top 20 discoverers of minor planets. As of 2016, he is credited by the Minor Planet Center with the discovery of 1162 numbered minor planets he made at Višnjan Observatory during 1996–2001. In addition, he is credited with the co-discovery of another 132 minor planets. His discoveries include the slowly-rotating outer main-belt asteroid 10415 Mali Lošinj, and 10645 Brač, a member of the Eunomia family of asteroids. He has also discovered two comets, namely 183P/Korlević-Jurić and 203P/Korlević.

Career 

Korlević became active in astronomy during his college years in Pula, where he became active within a local amateur astronomical society. He spent the next few years honing his art, by making telescopes and teaching others, including teaching posts at the Amateur Astronomical Society of Višnjan. In 1981 Korlević was qualified with a B.Sc. from the pedagogical faculty of Rijeka. Towards the end of the 1980s, after some time teaching at polytechnic schools, he co-founded the Yugoslav School of Astronomy, later known as the Višnjan School of Astronomy. 

Within this organisation he was able to study meteors and asteroids more seriously, and played a central role in the forming of the International Meteor Organization as the organization formed. Korlević participated in the first International Tunguska Expedition. Motivated by new lines of research raise by this expedition, Korlević set about replacing the Višnjan Observatory's telescope, which had been badly damaged during the civil war in Yugoslavia. In particular, the telescope was sent to Sarajevo to help the defenders during the Siege of Sarajevo. In 1995 this new telescope produced the first astrometric line, and soon Korlević and his colleagues had discovered previously undiscovered asteroids, a big breakthrough for Croatian astronomy.

The Višnjan team have built a new observatory some 4 km away in Tićan to continue their work on Near Earth Objects (NEO). On the Tićan site they have also built the world's largest Schumann Antenna. They'll use this to prove that meteors penetrating the ionosphere have a significant effect on Schumann resonances.

Korlević the Educator 

Korado Korlević was the editor of Nebeske krijesnice, an astronomy newsletter, and an often-quoted expert for astronomical articles on the topic of small bodies and impact. The teaching of astronomy, and passing his enthusiasm for it onto younger generations, is still a central priority for Korlević, and he spends much time teaching.

Affiliations 
Korlević is a member of the following organisations:
 International Meteor Organization
 The Planetary Society
 Spaceguard Foundation
 Astronomical Society of the Pacific
 European Council for High Ability (ECHA)
 National Geographic Society
 Croatian entomological society
 Lions International

Awards and honours 
 Municipality of Višnjan-Visignano Award 2016 - "for his contributions to education, society and astronomy"
 Poreč city prize "San Mauro"  — "for educational achievements"
 The asteroid 10201 Korado was  named after him for his contributions to education, society and astronomy
 Edgar Wilson Award 1999 — "for comet discovery"
 Edgar Wilson Award 2000 — "for comet discovery"
 Ivan Filipović Award 2002 — Croatian Ministry of Education

List of discovered minor planets

References

External links 
 Korado Korlević at the Višnjan Observatory official website
 Korado Korlević on the Croatian Walk of Fame in Opatija

20th-century astronomers
21st-century astronomers
20th-century Croatian people
21st-century Croatian scientists
1958 births
Croatian astronomers
Discoverers of asteroids

Living people
People from Poreč
University of Rijeka alumni